Luís Manuel Ribeiro de Castro (born 3 September 1961) is a Portuguese football manager and former player who played as a right-back. He is the current head coach of Brazilian club Botafogo.

Early life
He moved to Casal dos Claros and Vieira de Leiria in the Leiria District, due to his father's military profession. At age 11, he nearly died of purpura, which stopped him from playing football for three years. 

For two years, Castro was a student of Physics at the University of Coimbra.

Playing career
Castro spent most of his 17-year professional career in the lower leagues, representing U.D. Leiria, O Elvas CAD, AD Fafe and R.D. Águeda in the Segunda Liga and Vitória S.C. and Elvas in the Primeira Liga.

With the latter, he appeared in 28 matches in the 1987–88 season, but his team ranked in 15th place and suffered relegation.

Managerial career

Portugal
One year after retiring from professional football, Castro began working as a manager with his final club Águeda, where he would remain for two seasons. He went on to be in charge of lowly , C.D. Estarreja and A.D. Sanjoanense, before being appointed at F.C. Penafiel in the top tier in summer 2004 and guiding it to the 11th position in his debut campaign, the highlight being a 1–0 home win against S.L. Benfica.

Following Penafiel's relegation in 2006, Castro left the club, joining FC Porto's youth academy and eventually coaching the reserves. On 5 March 2014, following the resignation of Paulo Fonseca at the helm of the main squad, he was put in interim charge until the end of the season.

Castro led Porto's reserves to the LigaPro title in 2015–16; they were the first B team to win the division and as such ineligible for promotion. He then managed three sides in the Portuguese top flight after leaving for Rio Ave F.C. in November 2016, going on to G.D. Chaves and Vitória de Guimarães. In May 2019, at the end of his only campaign at the Estádio D. Afonso Henriques, he secured for them fifth place and a spot in the UEFA Europa League at the expense of neighbours Moreirense FC.

Shakhtar Donetsk
On 12 June 2019, Castro signed a two-year contract at FC Shakhtar Donetsk as a replacement for compatriot Paulo Fonseca who left for A.S. Roma after winning three Ukrainian Premier League championships in a row. In his first season in Eastern Europe, the team's hopes of a sixth consecutive national cup were thwarted in the last 16 by FC Dynamo Kyiv, but they did win a fourth league title in a row and reached the semi-finals of the Europa League.

In the 2020–21 edition of the UEFA Champions League, Castro led Shakhtar to win twice over Real Madrid in the group stages, yet they eventually finished third in the group and dropped into the Europa League, where they were eliminated in the round of 16 by Fonseca's A.S. Roma. In April 2021, with the domestic title all but taken by their rivals Dynamo, he announced that he would leave at the end of the campaign. He ended his tenure on 9 May with a 1–0 win over FC Inhulets Petrove. In the Ukrainian Cup, they had a bye to the quarter-finals, where they lost 1–0 after extra time at second-tier FC Ahrobiznes Volochysk.

On 12 May 2021, Shakhtar announced that Castro would be leaving the club after two years in charge.

Al-Duhail
Castro agreed to a one-year contract with Al-Duhail SC of the Qatar Stars League on 10 August 2021. On 18 March 2022, immediately after having won the Emir Cup by defeating Al-Gharafa SC 5–1, he left by mutual consent.

Botafogo
On 25 March 2022, Castro was named head coach of Botafogo de Futebol e Regatas in the Brazilian Série A, on a two-year deal.

Managerial statistics

Honours

Manager
Estarreja
Terceira Divisão: 2002–03

Porto B
LigaPro: 2015–16

Shakhtar Donetsk
Ukrainian Premier League: 2019–20

Al-Duhail
Emir of Qatar Cup: 2022

References

External links

1961 births
Living people
People from Vila Real, Portugal
People from Marinha Grande
Sportspeople from Vila Real District
Portuguese footballers
Association football defenders
Primeira Liga players
Liga Portugal 2 players
Segunda Divisão players
U.D. Leiria players
Vitória S.C. players
O Elvas C.A.D. players
AD Fafe players
Portuguese football managers
Primeira Liga managers
Liga Portugal 2 managers
F.C. Penafiel managers
FC Porto B managers
FC Porto managers
Rio Ave F.C. managers
G.D. Chaves managers
Vitória S.C. managers
Ukrainian Premier League managers
FC Shakhtar Donetsk managers
Qatar Stars League managers
Al-Duhail SC managers
Campeonato Brasileiro Série A managers
Botafogo de Futebol e Regatas managers
Portuguese expatriate football managers
Expatriate football managers in Ukraine
Expatriate football managers in Qatar
Expatriate football managers in Brazil
Portuguese expatriate sportspeople in Ukraine
Portuguese expatriate sportspeople in Qatar
Portuguese expatriate sportspeople in Brazil
University of Coimbra alumni